The Ordre de la Concorde, French for "Order of Concord", was instituted in 1660 by Christiaan von Brandenburg-Bayreuth Markgraf of Bayreuth. The order was therefore the first order of chivalry in the small German state. The founder chose a fashionable French name as French was the language of the princely German courts.
The order had a single grade and it was worn around the neck on a red ribbon
On the front of the medaillon was the Motto "CONCORDANT" in golden letters over two palm branches. On the back the letters "C.E.M.Z.B." are depicted under a crown.

Bayreuth
1660 establishments in the Holy Roman Empire